Snares Like a Haircut is the fourth studio album by American noise rock duo No Age. The album was released on January 26, 2018, through Drag City Records.

Critical reception 

Snares Like a Haircut received favorable reviews upon release. According to Metacritic which assigns a normalized rating out of 100 to reviews from mainstream critics, the album received a score of 84, based on 20 reviews, indicating "universal acclaim."

Track listing

Personnel 
The following were credited with the artwork, mixing, and production of the album.

 Phillip Broussard Jr. — Mixing
 Daphne Fitzpatrick — Artwork
 Pete Lyman — Engineer, Mastering
 No Age — Primary Artist
 Randy Randall — Group Member
 Brian Roettinger — Design, Typography
 John Sinclair — Engineer
 Dean Spunt — Group Member

Charting

References 

No Age albums
2018 albums
Drag City (record label) albums